For Christ's Sake is a 2011 comedy film directed by Jackson Douglas, Produced by Will Raee written by Jeff Lewis and starring Alex Borstein.

Plot
This film is about a small-town priest named Robert, who finds out his estranged brother greatly needs money for cancer treatment. He secretly borrows from the church emergency fund and lends it to his brother, but later finds out his brother used the money to finance a pornographic movie.

Release
The film released on DVD on December 6, 2011.

Cast
 Sara Rue as Candy
 Alex Borstein as Mrs. Marcus
 Will Sasso as Alan
 Ike Barinholtz as Buster Cherry
 William Morgan Sheppard as Father Monahan
 Armin Shimerman as The Pope
 Kyle Bornheimer as Tony
 Jed Rees as Robert
 Michael Hitchcock as Tom
 Judith Shekoni as Mia do'em
 Chad Willett as Sid
 Jason Barry as Father Beckman
 Scott L. Schwartz as Gordy
 Nicola Charles as Mary Murphy
 Matt Champagne as Carl
 David Dean Bottrell as Sam

References

External links

2011 films
2011 comedy films
American comedy films
American independent films
Films about Catholic priests
Films about pornography
2011 independent films
2010s American films